was a Japanese samurai and commander of the Sengoku period. He was the third son of Date Tanemune His son Date Shigezane was also an important vassal of the Date clan.
Date Tanemune tried to adopt him to the Uesugi clan and had already agreed with the Uesugi clan on the plan. However some of the vassals opposed the plan, which escalated into the Tenbun Conflict. As a result, the plan failed.

In 1583, Sanemoto relinquished the family head position to Date Shigezane and retired to Hatchōme Castle.

References

1527 births
1587 deaths
Samurai
Date clan